The Chinese Journal of International Politics is a peer-reviewed academic journal published quarterly by Oxford University Press for the study of international relations based on modern methodology, historical studies and policy-oriented research. Most of its articles are either related to China or have implications for Chinese foreign policy. It was established in 2006 and the editor-in-chief is Yan Xuetong (Tsinghua University).

Abstracting and indexing 
The journal is abstracted and indexed in:
 EBSCOhost
 Social Sciences Citation Index
 SCOPUS
 The Standard Periodical Directory

According to the Journal Citation Reports, the journal has a 2014 impact factor of 1.312, ranking it 21st out of 85 journals in the category "Political Science".

See also 
 List of international relations journals

References

External links 

English-language journals
International relations journals
Oxford University Press academic journals
Academic journals about politics of China
Publications established in 2005
Quarterly journals